Suciu de Sus is a commune in Maramureș County, Transylvania, Romania. It is composed of three villages: Larga (Tágfalva), Suciu de Jos (Alsószőcs), and Suciu de Sus.

The commune lies on the banks of the river Suciu. It is located in the southern part of the county, on the border with Bistrița-Năsăud County and near the border with Cluj County.

In 2011, the commune had 3,868 residents. Of those, 91.13% were Romanians, and 4.52% Roma. 89.3% were Romanian Orthodox, 4.34% Greek-Catholic, and 1.94% Pentecostal.

The Church of the Holy Archangels, one of eight Wooden churches of Maramureș listed as a UNESCO World Heritage Site, was built in Suciu de Sus in 1633 and was moved to the nearby village of Rogoz in 1883.

References

Communes in Maramureș County
Localities in Transylvania